Schottenstein Stores Corp., based in Columbus, Ohio, is a holding company for various ventures of the Schottenstein family.  Jay Schottenstein and his sons Joey Schottenstein, Jonathan Schottenstein, and Jeffrey Schottenstein are the primary holders in the company.

Retail ventures
Schottenstein Stores owns stakes in DSW and American Signature Furniture; 15% of American Eagle Outfitters, retail liquidator SB360 Capital Partners, over 50 shopping centers, and 5 factories producing its shoes and furniture.

It also holds an ownership interest in American Eagle Outfitters, Wehmeyer in Germany, Cold Stone Creamery, The Mazel Company, Gidding-Jenny, Shiffren Willens jewelry stores, and Sara Fredericks boutiques.

Schottenstein had operated the chain of Value City discount department stores.

In 2006, a consortium of investors, including Schottenstein Stores, purchased 655 stores from grocery retailer Albertson's.

Brands
Schottenstein Stores owns the rights to various brands, including Bugle Boy (purchased in 2001), "Cannon", "Royal Velvet", "Charisma",  "Fieldcrest", J. Peterman, delia's, SB Premier Brands and Leslie Fay.

References

External links

Companies based in the Columbus, Ohio metropolitan area
Holding companies of the United States
Year of establishment missing